Dedeli may refer to:
 Dedeli, Valandovo, North Macedonia
 Dedeli, Kırşehir, in Kırşehir Province, Turkey

See also 
 Dədəli (disambiguation)